The following are lists of busiest airports in Croatia.

In graph

By passenger traffic

References

External links
CCAA 2009–2010 statistics
CCAA 2010–2011 statistics
CCAA 2011–2012 statistics
CCAA 2014–2015 statistics
2020 passenger traffic stats at the Croatian Bureau of Statistics website (11 February 2021)

Croatia
Busiest
Airports, busiest
Croatia
Airports, busiest